Marcelo José Pletsch (born 13 May 1976) is a former Brazilian professional footballer who played as a defender.

Career
In his homeland, Pletsch played with Ceará in the Campeonato Brasileiro Série B, before moving to Portuguese lower league club Oliveira de Frades.

In summer 1999, he moved to Germany signing with Borussia Mönchengladbach. At Mönchengladbach, he spent the first two seasons in the 2. Bundesliga before playing in the Bundesliga for the following four seasons. During the 2002–03 season, he gained notoriety for a "brutal" foul on Werder Bremen's Markus Daun who was forced out of action for half a year due to injuries sustained. In the second half of the 2004–05 season, he was suspended by the club after calling Mönchengladbach a "shitty club" and director of football Christian Hochstätter a "backstabber". During his six-year tenure at the club, Pletsch made a total of 142 league appearances and scored three goals.

Subsequently, Pletsch moved to 1. FC Kaiserslautern for the 2005–06 season. After a year of playing in Kaiserslautern, he left Germany and moved to Panionios of the Superleague Greece. Pletsch made 44 league appearances and scored six goals for the club. In January 2008, he transferred to Cypriot side Omonia where he stayed for a year and a half, making 35 league appearances without scoring a goal.

In July 2009, it was announced that Pletsch signed a one plus one-year contract for Serbian club Vojvodina. He left them at the end of the 2009–10 season.

In February 2011, Pletsch returned to Brazil after more than a decade to play with Cascavel in the Campeonato Paranaense.

Personal life
In a May 2011 interview with German sports magazine 11 Freunde, Pletsch stated he was the owner of a pig farm.

In November 2015, he was arrested for drug trafficking after police had seized a truck carrying  of marijuana near his hometown Toledo. In October 2016, it was reported that he was sentenced to a prison term of nine years and two months by a court in Curitiba, with the judgment upheld on appeal.

Career statistics

References

External links
 
 
 

1976 births
Living people
People from Toledo, Paraná
Brazilian footballers
Association football defenders
Ceará Sporting Club players
Campeonato Brasileiro Série B players
Borussia Mönchengladbach players
1. FC Kaiserslautern players
2. Bundesliga players
Bundesliga players
Panionios F.C. players
Super League Greece players
AC Omonia players
Cypriot First Division players
FK Vojvodina players
Serbian SuperLiga players
Brazilian expatriate footballers
Expatriate footballers in Portugal
Brazilian expatriate sportspeople in Portugal
Expatriate footballers in Germany
Brazilian expatriate sportspeople in Germany
Expatriate footballers in Greece
Brazilian expatriate sportspeople in Greece
Expatriate footballers in Cyprus
Brazilian expatriate sportspeople in Cyprus
Expatriate footballers in Serbia
Brazilian expatriate sportspeople in Serbia
Sportspeople from Paraná (state)